Binfield Heath is a village and civil parish in South Oxfordshire, England,  south-southwest of Henley-on-Thames and  northeast of Reading on a southern knoll of the Chiltern Hills. The 2011 Census recorded the parish population as 709. The village has a Congregational Church, ground for polo, Michelin star chef-run restaurant, and public house. 12 of its 294 homes are listed buildings.

History and creation as a village

Remains of what is believed to be a Roman temple have been discovered on the north side of the village at High Wood. Binfield Heath takes its name from the Saxon hundred of Binfield to which it belonged, along with much of the locality. The name Binfield itself derives from Benifeld, noted in 1176 with later variant spellings, and may come from an original Beonan field, ‘a field belonging to Beona'. Because of the poor quality of land in this area it was left as heath, roughly in the centre of what is now the village. The heath was originally common land, lying between what is now Dunsden Way, Gravel Road, Emmer Green Road and Common Lane. The heath had four gates leading onto it, one each at the Bottle & Glass, the New Inn, The Coach and Horses and Coppid Cross Roads. Local inhabitants had the right to pasture their animals on it. Shiplake Row, leading down from Binfield Heath towards Shiplake Cross, was among the earliest roads to be populated.

Until 2003, half of Binfield Heath and the hamlet of Crowsley were the western part of the civil parish of Shiplake with the rest in the parish of Eye & Dunsden. This almost exactly rectangular tract of land acquired its own civil parish in 2003. Having some other amenities, Binfield Heath meets the criteria of a village — omitting the old criterion of an Anglican place of worship to give the contemporary definition of a village. A house on Arch Hill was used as headquarters for an illegal global drug operation until it was raided in 1977 under Operation Julie, as recounted by Leaf Fielding in the book To live outside the law.

The village has revived the tradition of the annual 'wheelbarrow race', which used to run in the seventies and eighties between the Bottle and Glass Inn on Bones Lane and the White Hart at Shiplake Row (now Orwells restaurant), a distance of 1.2 miles. Pairs competed in fancy dress, with one entrant riding and the other pushing. Both would down a pint of beer at the start before charging down Common Lane towards Arch Hill and the village stores; when they reached the halfway point at the New Inn (since closed), they would down another beer before swapping roles and making for the finish at the White Hart where a final pint awaited them. The event was held on public roads and discontinued in 1991. After a hiatus of nearly 30 years, the event took place on the village recreation ground on 9 June 2019. The village has for the past 70 years held a Dog and Flower show which takes place on the field opposite Holmwood House

Geography

Binfield Heath has an almost continuous street of Victorian houses, Shiplake Row, which leads  and descends 25 metres to the larger village of Shiplake by the River Thames. Crowsley Park Wood is the parish's largest woodland and is the opposite side of the village from the combined 'Comp Wood, The Common and Oakhouse Wood' and the field-surrounded Kings Common woodland.

Landmarks

The Crowsley Park estate, including a Grade II listed, 18th century mansion house, a grotto, barns and a stable, is west of the village centre which has the vast majority of buildings in the village. In the heart of the village and to the west and south are 11 other homes, also listed: Jasmine Cottage, Freize Farmhouse, The Well House, Fir Tree Cottage, Thatched Cottage, Shiplake Rise Cottage, Holmwood, The Bottle and Glass, The Old House, Coppice Cottage, Elm Tree Farmhouse, Hampstead Farm Stable, and seven barns. Keeps Well, a covered well by Holmwood house was accidentally demolished by a tractor driver in the 1990s, but has subsequently been rebuilt. 

There used to be two brick kilns on the east end of Kiln Lane; the first dates back to 1817 and closed between 1903 and 1907, the other kiln closed in 1935. At the west end of Kiln Lane are some timber houses, donated by Sweden at the end of the Second World War to ease the housing shortage. The village smithy, which stands next to the chestnut tree in the centre of the village, is now The Forge Garage. The village still has a local post office and village store which serves the every growing community

Congregational church
The Congregational Church was built in a Gothic Revival style in 1835, an early embellished example of what was considered a nonconformist and which remains a Protestant place of worship.

Amenities
The Bottle and Glass Inn
Restaurant: Orwells, open since 2010 by Michelin-starred chef Ryan Simpson.
Polo club and horse riding lessons.
Village shop with Post Office and off licence: Binfield Heath Stores
Motor mechanics: R Cotterill and son
Recreation ground and play park

Notable people
Christian Bale, actor, lived on Gravel Road and attended nearby Shiplake Primary School. 
Robert Hardy, actor, lived in Binfield Heath near High Wood. The house sported a weather vane showing an archer, after the actor's passion for archery. 
Amanda Jennings, author, lives in Kiln Lane.
Lane Meddick, actor, made numerous film and TV appearances, including Z Cars and Coronation Street.
Rupert Murdoch, media mogul, lives at Holmwood in the village, with his wife Jerry Hall. 
Tom Rowlands, musician with electronic duo The Chemical Brothers grew up in the village and attended Shiplake Primary School.

Demography
The population rose by 9.6% in the ten years to 2011 (from 643 in 2001 to 709). Binfield Heathians are known as 'fuzz-croppers', as distinct from the nearby Shiplake 'water rats'.

Nearest places

Notes and references
Notes 

References

External links

Binfield Heath community website
Binfield Heath Church

Villages in Oxfordshire
Civil parishes in Oxfordshire